Abdul Quasem was a Member of the 3rd National Assembly of Pakistan as a representative of East Pakistan.

Career
Quasem was a Member of the 3rd National Assembly of Pakistan representing Rangpur-I.

References

Pakistani MNAs 1962–1965
Living people
Year of birth missing (living people)
Place of birth missing (living people)